Lisicky is a surname. Notable people with the surname include:

Michael Lisicky (born 1964), American non-fiction writer, journalist, and oboist
Paul Lisicky (born 1959), American novelist and memoirist
Peter Lisicky (born 1976), American basketball player